TCGA may refer to:
 The Cancer Genome Atlas
 The Center for Genetic Anthropology at University College London
 Taxation of Chargeable Gains Act 1992
Thomas Cook Group Airlines Limited - entered compulsory liquidation 23 September 2019